Anomalotinea is a genus of moths belonging to the family Tineidae.

Species
Anomalotinea almaella   (G. Petersen, 1957)
Anomalotinea chellalalis  (Rebel, 1901)
Anomalotinea cubiculella  (Staudinger, 1859)
Anomalotinea gardesanella (Hartig, 1950)
Anomalotinea fulvescentella  (Lucas, 1956) (Moroccos)
Anomalotinea wernoi  Gaedike, 2009  (Moroccos)
Anomalotinea leucella  (Turati, 1926)
Anomalotinea liguriella  (Millière, 1879)
Anomalotinea paepalella (Walsingham, 1907) (Algeria, Tunesia, Saudi Arabia)
Anomalotinea pseudoranella   (Petersen & Gaedike, 1979)
Anomalotinea tisliticola  Gaedike & Kullberg, 2015 (Moroccos)

References

Tineinae